Hylidae is a wide-ranging family of frogs commonly referred to as "tree frogs and their allies". However, the hylids include a diversity of frog species, many of which do not live in trees, but are terrestrial or semiaquatic.

Taxonomy and systematics
The earliest known fossils that can be assigned to this family are from the Cretaceous of India and the state of Wyoming in the United States.

The common name of "tree frog" is a popular name for several species of the family Hylidae. However, the name "treefrog" is not unique to this family, also being used for many species in the family Rhacophoridae.

The following genera are recognised in the family Hylidae:

 Subfamily Hylinae
 Tribe Cophomantini 
 Aplastodiscus – canebrake treefrogs 
 Boana – gladiator treefrogs 
 Bokermannohyla
 Hyloscirtus
 Myersiohyla
 Nesorohyla
 "Hyla" nicefori
 Tribe Dendropsophini
Dendropsophus
 Julianus
 Lysapsus – harlequin frogs
 Ololygon (synonymous with Scinax)
 Pseudis – swimming frogs
 Scarthyla – Madre de Dios tree frogs
 Scinax – snouted tree frogs
 Sphaenorhynchus – lime tree frogs
 Xenohyla
 Tribe Hylini
 Acris – cricket frogs
 Atlantihyla 
 Bromeliohyla Charadrahyla Dryophytes – Ameroasian treefrogs
 Duellmanohyla – brook frogs
 Ecnomiohyla Exerodonta Hyla – common tree frogs
 Isthmohyla Megastomatohyla Plectrohyla – spike-thumb frogs
 Pseudacris – chorus frogs
 Ptychohyla – stream frogs
 Quilticohyla Rheohyla – small-eared treefrog
 Sarcohyla Smilisca – burrowing frogs
 Tlalocohyla Triprion – shovel-headed tree frogs
 Tribe Lophiohylini
 Aparasphenodon – casque-headed frogs
 Argenteohyla – Argentinian frogs
 Corythomantis – casque-headed tree frog
 Dryaderces 
 Itapotihyla Nyctimantis – brown-eyed tree frogs
 Osteocephalus – slender-legged tree frogs
 Osteopilus Phyllodytes – heart-tongued frogs
 Phytotriades – Trinidad golden treefrogs
 Tepuihyla – Amazon tree frogs
 Trachycephalus – casque-headed tree frog
 Incertae sedis
 "Hyla" imitator – mimic tree frog
 Subfamily Pelodryadinae (Australian tree frogs)
 Litoria Nyctimystes Ranoidea Incertae sedis
 "Litoria" castanea 
 "Litoria" jeudii 
 "Litoria" louisiadensis 
 "Litoria" obtusirostris 
 "Litoria" vagabunda 
 Subfamily Phyllomedusinae (leaf frogs)
 Agalychnis Callimedusa Cruziohyla Hylomantis – rough leaf frogs
 Phasmahyla – shining leaf frogs
 Phrynomedusa – colored leaf frogs
 Phyllomedusa PithecopusThe subfamilies Pelodryadinae and Phyllomedusinae are sometimes classified as distinct families of their own due to their deep divergence and unique evolutionary history (with Pelodryadinae being the sister group to Phyllomedusinae and colonizing Australia during the Eocene via Antarctica, which at the time was not yet frozen over), but are presently retained in the Hylidae.

Description
Most hylids show adaptations suitable for an arboreal lifestyle, including forward-facing eyes providing binocular vision, and adhesive pads on the fingers and toes. In the nonarboreal species, these features may be greatly reduced, or absent.

Distribution and habitat
The European tree frog (Hyla arborea) is common in the middle and south of Europe, and its range extends into Asia and North Africa.

North America has many species of the family Hylidae, including the gray tree frog (Hyla versicolor) and the American green tree frog (H. cinerea). The spring peeper (Pseudacris crucifer)  is also widespread in the eastern United States and is commonly heard on spring and summer evenings.

Behaviour and ecology
Species of the genus Cyclorana are burrowing frogs that spend much of their lives underground.

Breeding
Hylids lay their eggs in a range of different locations, depending on species. Many use ponds, or puddles that collect in the holes of their trees, while others use bromeliads or other water-holding plants. Other species lay their eggs on the leaves of vegetation hanging over water, allowing the tadpoles to drop into the pond when they hatch.

A few species use fast-flowing streams, attaching the eggs firmly to the substrate. The tadpoles of these species have suckers enabling them to hold on to rocks after they hatch. Another unusual adaptation is found in some South American hylids, which brood the eggs on the back of the female. The tadpoles of most hylid species have laterally placed eyes and broad tails with narrow, filamentous tips.

Feeding
Hylids mostly feed on insects and other invertebrates, but some larger species can feed on small vertebrates.

Gallery

 References This article incorporates text from the Collier's New Encyclopedia (1921).Further reading
"Amero-Australian Treefrogs (Hylidae)". William E. Duellman. Grzimek's Animal Life Encyclopedia''. Ed. Michael Hutchins, Arthur V. Evans, Jerome A. Jackson, Devra G. Kleiman, James B. Murphy, Dennis A. Thoney, et al. Vol. 6: Amphibians. 2nd ed.  Detroit: Gale, 2004. p225-243.

External links 

Amnh.org: Amphibian Species of the World

 
Amphibian families
Extant Thanetian first appearances
Taxa named by Constantine Samuel Rafinesque